The 1985 North Indian Ocean cyclone season was part of the annual cycle of tropical cyclone formation. The season has no official bounds but cyclones tend to form between April and December. These dates conventionally delimit the period of each year when most tropical cyclones form in the northern Indian Ocean. There are two main seas in the North Indian Ocean—the Bay of Bengal to the east of the Indian subcontinent and the Arabian Sea to the west of India. The official Regional Specialized Meteorological Centre in this basin is the India Meteorological Department (IMD), while the Joint Typhoon Warning Center (JTWC) releases unofficial advisories. An average of five tropical cyclones form in the North Indian Ocean every season with peaks in May and November. Cyclones occurring between the meridians 45°E and 100°E are included in the season by the IMD.

Systems

Tropical Storm One (1B)

Tropical Storm One, which developed in the central Bay of Bengal on May 22, strengthened to a peak of 70 mph winds before hitting Bangladesh on the 25th. The storm brought torrential rains and flooding, killing around 11,069 people and leaving hundreds of thousands homeless. Advance warning likely cut back on what could have been a much higher death toll.

Tropical Storm Two (2A)

A tropical depression formed in the central Arabian Sea on May 28. It headed northward, reaching a peak of 60 mph winds before hitting western India on the 31st. The storm dissipated on the 1st.

Cyclonic Storm BOB 05

Tropical Storm Three (3B)

Tropical Storm Three, which developed in the central Bay of Bengal, moved northwestward to hit India on the 11th as a 60 mph storm.

Tropical Storm Four (4B)

Tropical Cyclone 04B had a long life. It was first detected on 9 October, almost a week before the initial warning was issued, as an area of poorly organized convection in the South China Sea. The Tropical Disturbance was developing in the active monsoon trough, midway between Tropical Cyclone 03B in the Bay of Bengal, and a disturbance in the Philippine Sea that would soon develop into Typhoon Cecil.
38 people were killed when the 60 mph Tropical Storm Four hit the state of Odisha in India on October 16. Storm surge as high as 2 meters hit the villages of Chilika, Tangi and Krishna Prasad in at the time of landfall which resulted to be submerged for three days.

Tropical Storm Five (5B)

On November 17, 65 mph Tropical Storm Five, which developed on the 13th, hit eastern India. The storm brought heavy flooding, but no damage or deaths were reported.

Tropical Storm Six (6B)

50 mph Tropical Storm Six, having developed on December 9, hit southeastern India on the 13th.

See also

North Indian Ocean tropical cyclone
1985 Atlantic hurricane season
1985 Pacific hurricane season
1985 Pacific typhoon season
Australian cyclone seasons: 1984–85, 1985–86
South Pacific cyclone seasons: 1984–85, 1985–86
South-West Indian Ocean cyclone seasons: 1984–85, 1985–86

References

External links
India Meteorological Department
Joint Typhoon Warning Center 

 
1985 NIO